Inga-Stina Robson, Baroness Robson of Kiddington (née Arvidsson; 20 August 1919 – 9 February 1999), often known as Stina Robson, was an Anglo-Swedish political activist.

Born to a wealthy family in Stockholm as Inga-Stina Arvidsson, she attended Ölinska Girls' School before becoming a secretary in the Swedish Ministry for Foreign Affairs' office in London, where she met Lawrence Robson, an accountant, and the two married in 1940.  During World War II, she worked as a translator for the British Ministry of Information.

Robson settled at Kiddington Hall near Woodstock, Oxfordshire, and worked on her husband's unsuccessful candidature for the Liberal Party in Banbury at the 1950 general election.  Their house was used as a conference centre and was popular for Liberal Party events.  In the run-up to the 1955 general election, Lawrence was the Liberals' prospective candidate in Eye, but he was appointed to a government commission and withdrew, leaving Inga-Stina to fight the seat, although she was not successful. Later the same year, she became a magistrate.

Robson stood again in Eye at the 1959 general election, then in Gloucester in 1964 and 1966. Although she never came close to election to Westminster, she was elected to Chipping Norton Rural District Council.

In 1968, Robson became President of the Women's Liberal Federation, standing down in 1970 when she was elected President of the Liberal Party.  As president, she opposed radicalism and, in particular, the policies advocated by the National League of Young Liberals.  She was created  Baroness Robson of Kiddington, of Kiddington in the County of Oxfordshire on 14 May 1974, becoming the Liberals' spokesperson on agriculture and the environment in the House of Lords. In 1982, she succeeded her husband as Chair of the National Liberal Club, and also as Chair of the Anglo-Swedish Society. She joined the Liberal Democrats, successors of the Liberal Party, and in 1988, she chaired a panel investigating fraud in the European Union. She stood down as a magistrate in 1989, by which time she was the longest-serving magistrate in the country. In 1993, she became the party spokesperson on health.

Lady Robson was the Chairman of the charity Attend (then National Association of Leagues of Hospital Friends) from 1986 to 1994. When she retired in 1994, she was honored as vice president; a position she would hold from 1995 to 1998.

References

1919 births
1999 deaths
Councillors in Oxfordshire
Liberal Democrats (UK) life peers
Liberal Party (UK) life peers
Presidents of the Liberal Party (UK)
Swedish emigrants to the United Kingdom
20th-century British women politicians
Liberal Party (UK) parliamentary candidates
Politicians from Stockholm
Liberal Party (UK) councillors
20th-century British civil servants
Swedish civil servants
Women councillors in England
Life peeresses created by Elizabeth II